Prince Dimitri Nicholas Paul George Maria of Yugoslavia (born 18 June 1958), also known as Dimitri Karageorgevich or Dimitrije Karađorđević, is a gemologist and member of the 
Royal House of Yugoslavia. He founded the jewelry firm bearing his name, Prince Dimitri Company, and continues to serve as its president and creative director. He was formerly senior vice president of the jewelry department of the Sotheby's auction house. He was named to the International Best Dressed List's Hall of Fame in 1994.

Life and career
Born in Boulogne-Billancourt, France, 
Prince Dimitri was raised in Versailles, attending boarding schools in France and Switzerland. He graduated from the University of Paris with a degree in business law and moved to New York City in 1983.

Originally pursuing a career on Wall Street, he decided to move into the field of jewelry and was offered a position in Sotheby's jewelry department, eventually rising to senior vice president. During his sixteen years with Sotheby's, he also became an appraiser and studied gemology. Prince Dimitri began designing jewelry in 1999, with a collection of gemstone cufflinks that was sold at Bergdorf Goodman and Saks Fifth Avenue. He also designed a line of women's jewelry for Barneys New York and Neiman Marcus. In 2002, he moved to the Phillips de Pury & Luxembourg auction house to head their jewelry department. In 2007, he and business partner Todd Morley founded the Prince Dimitri Company, which opened a salon in Manhattan. His jewelry has also been sold at auction by Christie's.

Family
Prince Dimitri and Prince Michael of Yugoslavia are the first set of twins born to Prince Alexander of Yugoslavia and his first wife, Princess Maria Pia of Savoy, the eldest daughter of Umberto II of Italy in 1958. Maria Pia had a second set of twins, Prince Serge and Princess Helene of Yugoslavia in 1963. They have a younger half-brother, Prince Dushan of Yugoslavia, from their father's second marriage to Princess Barbara of Liechtenstein.

Prince Dimitri belongs to the cadet branch of the Royal House of Yugoslavia, descending from Prince Regent Paul of Yugoslavia. He is a third cousin of Alexander, Crown Prince of Yugoslavia.

Honours
  House of Karađorđević: Knight Grand Cordon of the Royal Order of the Star of Karađorđe 
  House of Savoy: Knight Grand Cross of the Royal Order of Saints Maurice and Lazarus
  House of Savoy: Knight of the Supreme Order of the Most Holy Annunciation

Ancestry
Dimitri is a member of the House of Karađorđević cadet branch. He is a grand-grand-grandson of the Prince Alexander of Serbia (Reign 1842–1858). Through his father, Dimitri descends from kings George I of Greece, Alexander II of Russia, and Christian IX of Denmark.

Through his mother, Dimitri descends from kings Umberto II of Italy, Albert I of Belgium, and furthermore from Nicholas I of Montenegro and Miguel I of Portugal.

References

External links
 PrinceDimitri.com
 Coat of Arms of HRH Prince Dimitrije Karageorgevich

1958 births
Living people
Yugoslav princes
Karađorđević dynasty
Serbian people of Italian descent
Serbian people of Russian descent
Serbian people of Finnish descent
Serbian people of Swedish descent
Serbian people of Greek descent
Serbian people of German descent
Serbian people of Danish descent
French twins
Serbian princes
People from Boulogne-Billancourt